Planet Fabulous was released in 1994 and was Something Happens' fourth studio album after the success of Stuck Together with God's Glue. Singles included "Flag," "Rosewood," and "Planet Fabulous."

Track listing
 "Flag" – 4:16
 "Are You My Girl" - 3:13
 "Fataler Femmes" - 3:31
 "Here Come the Soldiers" - 2:27
 "Rosewood" - 2:50
 "Winds Future Wife" - 2:02
 "Heart of a Driver" - 2:57
 "A 70's Wedding" - 3.28
 "c.c Incidentally" - 3:10
 "Xuxa" - 1:46
 "Planet Fabulous" - 2:53
 "God Awful Complications" - 2:44
 "Divide" - 2:11
 "Momentary Thing" - 4:01

References

1994 albums
Something Happens albums